The Dudbridge Iron Works Limited of Stroud, Gloucestershire, England was a reciprocating engine manufacturer including Salmson water-cooled aero-engines under licence from Salmson in France from 1914 to 1918.

Bibliography
 (Page 168)

References

Defunct aircraft engine manufacturers of the United Kingdom